The following are the winners of the 38th annual (2011) Origins Award, presented at Origins 2012:

External links
 2011 Origins Awards Winners and Nominees

2011 awards
 
2011 awards in the United States